Charles Edward Stewart,  (born 10 June 1946) is a Church of Scotland minister and former Royal Navy chaplain.

Stewart was educated at Strathclyde University and ordained a Church of Scotland Minister in 1976. In that year he became a naval chaplain: his service included
 HMS Sea Hawk, RNAS Culdrose, 1976–1978 
 Clyde Submarine Base, 1978–1980; 
 Staff of Flag Officer 3rd Flotilla, 1980;
 HMS Hermes, Falklands War, 1981-1982 
 HMS Neptune, 1982–1985;
 HMS Drake, 1985–1987;
 HMS Raleigh, 1987–1990
 BRNC, Dartmouth, 1990–1993;
 Assistant Director, Royal Navy Chaplaincy Service, 1992–1994;
 HMS Invincible, Bosnia, 1994–1996;
 Director-general Royal Navy Chaplaincy Service, 1996–1997;
 Chaplain of the Fleet, 1998–2000
 QHC 1996–2000. 
 Chaplain, Royal Hospital School, 2000–10

He was awarded the South Atlantic Medal in 1982; and the NATO Medal in 1995.

Notes

1946 births
Living people
Chaplains of the Fleet
Alumni of the University of Strathclyde
Honorary Chaplains to the Queen
20th-century Ministers of the Church of Scotland
21st-century Ministers of the Church of Scotland